The 2013–14 Ford Trophy was the 43rd season of the official List A cricket tournament in New Zealand, and the third in a sponsorship deal between New Zealand Cricket and Ford Motor Company. The competition ran from 2 March 2014 to 5 April 2014. The tournament was won by the Wellington for the seventh time, after defeating Northern Districts in the final by four wickets.

Points table

 Teams qualified for the finals

Finals

1st Preliminary Final

2nd Preliminary Final

3rd Preliminary Final

Final

References

External links
 Series home at ESPN Cricinfo

Ford Trophy
2013–14 New Zealand cricket season
Ford Trophy